The 2017 CSU Pueblo ThunderWolves football team represented Colorado State University–Pueblo as a member of the Rocky Mountain Athletic Conference (RMAC) during 2017 NCAA Division II football season. The ThunderWolves played their home games at Neta and Eddie DeRose ThunderBowl  in Pueblo, Colorado.

Schedule

Ranking movements

References

CSU-Pueblo
CSU Pueblo ThunderWolves football seasons
Rocky Mountain Athletic Conference football champion seasons
CSU-Pueblo ThunderWolves football